Leon Joseph "Caddy" Cadore (November 20, 1891 – March 16, 1958) was an American right-handed pitcher in Major League Baseball from 1915 to 1924.

Early life
Born in Chicago, Illinois, Cadore was orphaned at 13 and went to live with his uncle, Joe Jeannot, in northern Idaho in Hope, a village east of Sandpoint on the shore of Lake Pend Oreille. Cadore graduated from Sandpoint High School, then attended Gonzaga University in Spokane from 1906 to 1908. He played college baseball for the Gonzaga Bulldogs.

Professional baseball career
Cadore played for the Brooklyn Robins from 1915 to 1923 and then finished his MLB career with the Chicago White Sox in 1923 and New York Giants in 1924. He compiled a career win–loss record of 68–72. Cadore was a roommate of Casey Stengel while with the Robins.

Cadore is best known for his performance in a 1920 game in which both he and Joe Oeschger pitched all 26 innings for their respective teams before the game was called a tie due to darkness. Cadore faced 96 batters in the game, an MLB record dating back to at least 1901. He and Oeschger share the MLB record for most innings pitched in a single game.  

Cadore served as an officer in the U.S. Army during World War I.

Personal life
Cadore married Maie Ebbets, daughter of Brooklyn Robins owner Charles Ebbets. After a career on Wall Street in the 1920s, they moved to Hope in the 1930s to mine the family copper interests. His wife died in 1950, and he succumbed to cancer at age 66 at the Veterans Hospital in Spokane, Washington, in 1958. Cadore is buried at Pinecrest Memorial Park in Sandpoint.

Minor league career
Cadore played for the following Minor League Baseball teams:
 Trenton Tigers (B; 1912)
 Wilkes-Barre Barons (B; 1912)
 Jersey City Skeeters (AA; 1912)
 Wilkes-Barre Barons (B; 1913)
 Buffalo Bisons (AA; 1913)
 Wilkes-Barre Barons (B;1914)
 Montreal Royals (AA; 1915–1916)
 Atlanta Crackers (A; 1918)
 Vernon Tigers (AA; 1924)

References

External links

1890s births
1968 deaths
Major League Baseball pitchers
Brooklyn Robins players
Chicago White Sox players
New York Giants (NL) players
Wilkes-Barre Barons (baseball) players
Jersey City Skeeters players
Trenton Tigers players
Buffalo Bisons (minor league) players
Montreal Royals players
Atlanta Crackers players
Vernon Tigers players
Gonzaga Bulldogs baseball players
Baseball players from Chicago